The 2002 ASCAR season was the 2nd season of United Kingdom-based NASCAR style stock car racing, originally known as ASCAR.

Teams and drivers

Race calendar

The season consisted of eight meetings with either two or three races taking place at each. The grid for the opening race of each meeting was set by a qualifying session with the second race grid being set by the finishing order of the first. Two meetings were held at the EuroSpeedway in Germany with the remaining six at the Rockingham Motor Speedway in the United Kingdom.

Final points standings

References

External links
 ASCAR 2002 archive

Stock car racing in the United Kingdom
ASCAR